Frage may refer to:
 Tatjana Frage (born 1973), Israeli volleyball player
 Frage, a move in the card game German Solo#Frage